The British quarter farthing was a denomination of sterling coinage worth  of a pound,  of a shilling, or  of a penny. It was produced for circulation in Ceylon in various years between 1839 and 1853, with proof coins being produced in 1868. It is the smallest denomination of sterling coin ever minted. The coin is considered to be part of British coinage because Ceylon otherwise used standard sterling coin and it was made in the same style as the contemporary Ceylonese half-farthing which was legal tender in Britain between 1842 and 1869.

Coins were minted in 1839, 1851, 1852, 1853, and the proof issue of 1868. So, £1 worth of quarter farthings weighed 10 avoirdupois pounds. The 1868 coins were made of bronze or cupro-nickel, but weighed the same and had the same diameter.

The obverse bears the left-facing portrait of Queen Victoria, with the inscription , while the reverse bears a crown above the words  with a rose with three leaves at both sides at the bottom of the coin.

A quarter-farthing's conversion to current sterling denominations would place it at slightly more than one fortieth of a decimal penny. Allowing for inflation however, the quarter farthing would have a purchasing power of between 3p and 4p (£0.03 to £0.04) expressed in 2017 values.

References

External links

British Coins – information about British coins (from 1656 to 1952)

Coins of Great Britain
Pre-decimalisation coins of the United Kingdom
Coins of the United Kingdom